Seaboard Air Line Railway Depot in McBee is a historic train station located at McBee, Chesterfield County, South Carolina. It was built in 1914, and is a one-story, red brick building in a modified rectangular plan.  It has a sharply pitched hipped roof. After Seaboard discontinued passenger service in the 1960s, the McBee depot stood unused until the 1980s when the building was restored for use as the McBee Depot Library and Railroad Museum.

It was listed on the National Register of Historic Places in 1999.

References

External links
McBee Depot Library website

Railway stations on the National Register of Historic Places in South Carolina
Railway stations in the United States opened in 1914
Seaboard Air Line Railroad stations
National Register of Historic Places in Chesterfield County, South Carolina
Libraries in South Carolina
Museums in Chesterfield County, South Carolina
Railroad museums in South Carolina
Former railway stations in South Carolina